is a major national highway in eastern Honshū, Japan. Measuring  it is the longest highway in the country. When oversea routes are included, it is the second longest highway in Japan, with National Route 58 then measuring  because of its maritime sections. The highway connects Tokyo and Aomori via Utsunomiya, Kōriyama, Sendai, and Morioka.

From Saitama Prefecture to Iwate Prefecture, it parallels the Tōhoku Expressway; from Morioka to Hachinohe, it parallels the Hachinohe Expressway. At its northern terminus it links with National Route 7.

Route description

Tokyo

The southern terminus of National Route 4 lies at Nihonbashi, the kilometer zero of Japan in Chūō, Tokyo. The marker here signifies the terminus of national highways including National Route 1, National Route 6, National Route 14, National Route 15, National Route 17, and National Route 20. Of the mentioned highways, three travel concurrently with National Route 4 from Nihonbashi: National Routes 6, 14, and 17. 

Just north of the starting point, National Route 17 leaves the concurrency continuing north while National Route 4, along with National Routes 6 and 14, turn east on to Edo-dōri. Three blocks from there Edo-dōri intersects Shōwa-dōri. National Route 4 turns on to Shōwa-dōri leaving the Edo-dōri concurrency with National Routes 6 and 14. Traveling north along Showa-dōri, National Route 4 serves as a frontage road to the Ueno Route of the Shuto Expressway system between Chūō and Taitō. The Ueno Route merges in to National Route 4 just to the northeast of Ueno Station. The highway then crosses over the Sumida River into Adachi. From the northern side of the river to Utsunomiya, the highway is known as the Nikkō Kaidō. In the ward the highway crosses beneath the Central Circular Route of the Shuto Expressway system, with an interchange with the expressway's frontage road. National Route 4 travels north through Adachi, roughly paralleling the Tobu Skytree Line. It then curves to the northwest, crossing over the Kena River into the city of Sōka in Saitama Prefecture.

Saitama and Ibaraki prefectures
 Sōka–Koshigaya–Kasukabe–Sugito–Satte–Kuki
 Koga
 Westernmost point: Kuki, Saitama just west of a bridge carrying the route over the Tone River.

Tochigi Prefecture
 Nogi–Oyama–Shimotsuke–Kaminokawa, Shimotsuke, Utsunomiya–Takanezawa–Sakura–Yaita–Otawara–Nasushiobara–Nasu

Fukushima Prefecture
 Nishigo–Shirakawa–Izumizaki–Yabuki–Kagamiishi–Sukagawa–Kōriyama–Motomiya–Ōtama–Nihonmatsu–Fukushima–Date–Koori–Kunimi

Miyagi Prefecture
 Shiroishi–Zaō–Ōgawara–Murata–Shibata–Iwanuma–Natori–Taihaku-ku, Sendai–Wakabayashi-ku, Sendai–Miyagino-ku, Sendai–Izumi-ku, Sendai–Tomiya–Taiwa–Shiroishi–Ōhira–Ōsaki–Kurihara

Iwate Prefecture
 Ichinoseki–Hiraizumi–Ōshū–Kanegasaki–Kitakami–Hanamaki–Shiwa–Yahaba–Morioka–Takizawa–Iwate–Ichinohe–Ninohe
 Highest elevation:   at Jūsanbongi Pass, Ichinohe, Iwate

Aomori Prefecture

 Sannohe–Nanbu–Gonohe–Towada–Shichinohe–Tōhoku–Noheji–Hiranai–Aomori
 End point: Aomori (ends at the eastern terminus of the west bypass of National Route 7)

History

National Route 4 was preceded by the Tōsandō, a road initially established during the Asuka period as a road linking Kinai (now Kyoto and Nara) to what is now the vicinity of Morioka, Iwate. The portion of the Tōsandō that was later incorporated into National Route 4 lies between Tochigi Prefecture and Iwate Prefecture. The next development of the route came along with the creation of the Ōshū Kaidō (奥州街道) and Nikkō Kaidō (日光街道) as two of the five routes of the Edo period. They were established by Tokugawa Ieyasu for government officials traveling through the area to connect Edo (modern-day Tokyo) with Mutsu Province and the present-day city of Shirakawa, Fukushima Prefecture, Japan. There were also many roads that connected to the Ōshū Kaidō that are included in National Route 4. One such sub-route was the Sendaidō (仙台道), which connected Mutsu Province with Sendai. From Sendai, the Matsumaedō (松前道) connected Sendai with Cape Tappi and indirectly to Hakodate on the southern shore of Hokkaido on the Tsugaru Strait. Though the Ōshū Kaidō has only 27 post stations, there were over 100 designated post stations when the subroutes are included. Some sections and markers of the Ōshū Kaidō in their original state can still be found alongside National Route  4, the Hachinohe Expressway, and Tōhoku Expressway.

On 4 December 1952 First Class National Highway 4 (from Tokyo to Aomori) was established. The route was reclassified as a General National Highway on 1 April 1965. 

During the 2011 Great East Japan Earthquake many sections of the route in the Tōhoku area were damaged.

List of major junctions

See also
 Edo Five Routes, the five centrally administered routes, or kaidō, that connected the capital of Japan at Edo (now Tokyo) with the outer provinces during the Edo period.
 Tōhoku Expressway, an expressway managed by the East Nippon Expressway Company that parallels Route 4 from Tokyo to Aomori.

References

External links

 

004
Roads in Aomori Prefecture
Roads in Fukushima Prefecture
Roads in Ibaraki Prefecture
Roads in Iwate Prefecture
Roads in Miyagi Prefecture
Roads in Saitama Prefecture
Roads in Tochigi Prefecture
Roads in Tokyo